Andrew Jeffrey Gunion Barclay (1849–1943) was a Scottish mathematician, known for being one of the founders of the Edinburgh Mathematical Society.

Life and work 
Barclay studied at University of Edinburgh where he graduated in mathematics in 1880. Then he was professor of mathematics at George Watson's College (Edinburgh) and at High School of Glasgow. He retired in 1914 and went to reside in London with a son.

Barclay, with Alexander Yule Fraser and Cargill Gilston Knott, issued in January 1883 a circular calling for a Mathematical Society. That year the Edinburgh Mathematical Society was founded and Barclay became its president in 1884.

References

Bibliography

External links 
 

19th-century Scottish mathematicians
20th-century Scottish mathematicians
1849 births
1943 deaths